Black Down is a hill on the South Dorset Ridgeway about 2 kilometres north-northeast of the village of Portesham in the county of Dorset, England and around 5 kilometres from the coast.

The treeless summit of Black Down is a popular viewing point, crowned by the 72 foot high Hardy Monument built in 1844 in memory of Vice-Admiral Sir Thomas Masterman Hardy who was Admiral Nelson's Flag Captain at the Battle of Trafalgar.

From the top there are views of the Fleet and Chesil Beach as well as the South Dorset Downs. On a fine day The Needles may be visible, some 50 miles away.

The site is owned by the National Trust.

Gallery

References 

Hills of Dorset